Vishnu was a Norwegian rock band from Tromsø.

History
Vishnu was established in August 2002. In Autumn 2004, the band won a competition for new bands in the Norwegian national broadcasting corporation NRK, together with Rumble in Rhodos and Purified in Blood. The prize was a national tour in Norway in the spring of 2005.

In 2006, the band released an EP, Lost Soul's Church, on the label Feedback Underground, distributed by Tuba Records.

In 2010 their debut album, Outskirts of Love, was released on the label Big Dipper Records. On 13 January 2013, the band's second album, Nightbeat Love was released, to great critical acclaim.

Vishnu officially disbanded on 14 November 2013, posting a picture and statement on their Facebook page.

Band members 
 Tor Thomassen – vocals
 Tom Hansen – guitar
 Eigil Moe Johansen – percussion
 Olav Solvang – bass guitar
 Stian Grønbech – keyboards

Discography

Studio albums

Extended plays

Singles

References

External links 
 

Norwegian alternative rock groups
Musical groups established in 2003
Jangle pop groups
Indian mythology in music